Particle size describes the size of particles.

Particle size may also refer to:

 Grain size (also called particle size), the size of soils, powders, gravel, etc.
 Particle size distribution

See also
Particle (disambiguation)